William Washington, known professionally as WLPWR (pronounced Willpower) is a musician and music producer who founded SupaHotBeats in 2002, as well as BNDWTH, a record label and production studio based out of Atlanta founded by Washington in 2018.

Early career
Will began producing music as early as 1997 in while living in Columbia, SC. It was in the Carolinas that WLPWR first began to make a name for himself while producing for nearly every urban artist on the local independent scene. While working in a compound of music producers, and audio engineers, WLPWR worked with producer K-Def who mentored Will and taught him how to produce hip hop on Logic Pro. In an era before the internet, he was selling music out of his trunk. In 2001 WLPWR worked as a producer for Sylvia Robinson. In these early years of his career he met Yelawolf in the lobby of Sugar Hill Records, and they formed an instant connection.  During this time, his label SupaHotBeats was established in Columbia,SC. Through this label, Will started The Starving Artist Showcase, a music contest which later laid the foundation for his television show The Independent Music Review. The show aired on WACH Fox 57 in Columbia. In 2005 he made the decision to move his business to Atlanta, GA where the music industry was more accessible. In 2007, Will reconnected with Yelawolf to work on his studio album Fearin' and Loathin' in Smalltown, U.S.A. for Columbia Records.

2010 to 2011
In 2009 Will produced Yelawolfs Mixtape Trunk Muzik which was later re-released by Interscope Records as Trunk Muzik 0-60 Trunk Muzik launched Will further into his career as a Hip Hop Producer. Though he continued to work with Yelawolf on his debut for Shady Records, Will and Yelawolf never became exclusive to each other in terms of their work, despite their chemistry.

2013 to 2015
A few years after the release of the original Trunk Muzik, Will and Yelawolf returned to the studio and released Trunk Muzik Returns, which was another success. Building on this momentum, his most recent work is also another album he did with Yelawolf titled Love Story which debuted at No. 3 on the Billboard Chart hit No. 1 on the Billboard Chart (Hip Hop).

Production style
Will's production style attracted many other artists, including Rittz, Wiz Khalifa, Tech N9ne and Eminem. The way he describes his production style is a unique one-on-one collaboration with each different artist, tailoring his beats and sounds to the artist's personal style and working off the vibe they create together in the studio. When he is not working with other artists he continues to create music for himself as a musician, and helps other producers learn the business.

FreeGame Podcast
In 2016 Wlpwr started as podcast titled "The FreeGame Producers Podcast" in which he interviews music producers and other music industry professionals about the business of making music. Some of his guests included notable musicians such as Big K.R.I.T., !llmind, Focus..., Dj Toomp Jazze Pha and more. In 2019 the podcast partnered with AirBit and took the podcast to YouTube for viewers to watch the recorded interviews.

Discography

References

External links
WLPWR.com
Free Game Podcast
WLPWR on discogs
BNDWTH.net

People from Atlanta
Year of birth missing (living people)
Living people
American hip hop record producers
Record producers from South Carolina
American hip hop musicians